Phrynopus barthlenae is a species of frog in the family Strabomantidae.
It is endemic to Peru.
Its natural habitats are subtropical or tropical moist montane forest, subtropical or tropical high-altitude grassland, arable land, pastureland, and rural gardens.

References

Barthlenae
Amphibians of the Andes
Amphibians of Peru
Endemic fauna of Peru
Taxonomy articles created by Polbot
Amphibians described in 2002